28 Cygni is a binary star in the northern constellation of Cygnus. It is a faint blue-white hued star but visible to the naked eye with an apparent visual magnitude of 4.93.

This primary object is a B-type main-sequence star with a stellar classification of B2.5 V, per Lesh (1968). Slettebak (1982) found a class of B2 IV(e), which would suggest this is a more evolved subgiant star. It is a Be star, which means the spectrum displays emission lines due a disk of ejected gas in a Keplerian orbit around the star. The star displays short-term variability with two or more periods, and is classified as an SX Arietis variable by Samus et al. (2017). It is spinning rapidly with a projected rotational velocity of 320 km/s; estimated at round 80% of the critical rotation rate. This is giving the star an oblate shape with an equatorial bulge out to 6.5 times the Sun's radius, compared to 5.7 at the poles. The central star is orbited by a secondary companion star, which is a subdwarf O star. After previous failed attempts to find the star, the companion was detected using interferometry, but the orbital parameters are unknown.

References

B-type main-sequence stars
Be stars
SX Arietis variables
Cygnus (constellation)
Durchmusterung objects
Cygni, 28
191610
099303
7708
Cygni, V1624
Binary stars